Faulenrost is a municipality in the Mecklenburgische Seenplatte district, in Mecklenburg-Vorpommern, north-east Germany.

References